Kablukov could refer to:

 Ilya Kablukov (born 1988), Russian ice hockey player
 Ivan Alexsevich Kablukov (1857–1942), Russian and Soviet physical chemist